Die Trying is the only studio album by rock band Die Trying. It was released through Island Records on June 10, 2003.

That year, Die Trying toured with the likes of Andrew W.K. and Hoobastank in promotion of the album.

Single
"Oxygen's Gone" served as the album's only single. Its music video found significant airplay on Fuse TV and MTV2 during the summer of 2003. The band is seen performing in the city along with shots of young men freerunning across urban buildings and structures.  Hoobastank vocalist Doug Robb, also employed by Island Records, makes a brief cameo appearance in a car that's leaped over by one of the men. Jacoby Shaddix of Papa Roach makes a cameo appearance in the video as well.

Track listing

Personnel 

 Jassen Jensen - vocals
 Jack Sinamian - guitars
 Matt Conley - drums
 Steve Avery - bass
 Jacoby Shaddix - guest vocals on "Conquer The World"
 Roxy Saint - guest vocals on "Dirty Dirty"
Neal Avron – producer, engineer
Jay Baumgardner – mixing
Ryan Castle – assistant engineer
Travis Huff – digital editing, pro-tools
Louis Marino – art direction, design
Phil Mucci – photography, cover photo
Dean Nelson – assistant engineer

Charts
Album - Billboard (North America)

Singles - Billboard (North America)

References

External links
 Oxygen's Gone: Die Trying - AOL Video

Die Trying (band) albums
2003 debut albums
Albums produced by Neal Avron